Mike or Michael Whitaker may refer to:

Michael Whitaker, equestrian
Mike Whitaker (American football), in 2010 Fort Wayne FireHawks season
Mike Whitaker (swimmer)

See also
Michael Whittaker (disambiguation)